Euchlaenidia albilinea is a moth of the family Erebidae first described by Schaus in 1912. It is found in Costa Rica.

Taxonomy
The species was formerly included in the subfamily Dioptinae of the family Notodontidae.

References

Moths described in 1912
Euchlaenidia